Derrick Dowell (born September 8, 1965) is an American former professional basketball player.

Career 
Dowell emerged as a promising prospect while playing for Benjamin Bosse High School in his hometown of Evansville, Indiana, leading his team to a 51–2 record during his final two years with the team. He played collegiately with the USC Trojans while earning two first-team All-Pac-10 nominations in his final two seasons.

Dowell was selected in the 1987 NBA draft by the Washington Bullets as the 37th overall pick although he never played in the National Basketball Association (NBA). He spent one season with the Rapid City Thrillers of the Continental Basketball Association (CBA) before an achilles tendon injury ended his career.

Career statistics

College

|-
| style="text-align:left;"| 1983–84
| style="text-align:left;"| USC
| 27 || 10 || 22.4 || .434 || – || .600 || 4.6 || 1.1 || 1.2 || .6 || 6.4
|-
| style="text-align:left;"| 1984–85
| style="text-align:left;"| USC
| 29 || – || 32.0 || .560 || – || .617 || 8.3 || 2.0 || 1.6 || .4 || 11.6
|-
| style="text-align:left;"| 1985–86
| style="text-align:left;"| USC
| 25 || 19 || 31.0 || .519 || – || .698 || 7.8 || 1.8 || 1.5 || .7 || 15.5
|-
| style="text-align:left;"| 1986–87
| style="text-align:left;"| USC
| 28 || 28 || 36.8 || .491 || .273 || .630 || 8.8 || 2.3 || 2.2 || .3 || 20.9
|- class="sortbottom"
| style="text-align:center;" colspan="2"| Career
| 109 || 57 || 30.6 || .504 || .273 || .640 || 7.4 || 1.8 || 1.6 || .5 || 13.6

Personal life
Dowell's sister, Cheryl, was a fellow basketball standout at Bosse High School and played for the Long Beach State 49ers. His daughter, Jalaya, plays college basketball for the Oakland City Mighty Oaks and previously for the Bellarmine Knights.

References

1965 births
Living people
African-American basketball players
American men's basketball players
Basketball players from Indiana
Power forwards (basketball)
Rapid City Thrillers players
Small forwards
Sportspeople from Evansville, Indiana
USC Trojans men's basketball players
Washington Bullets draft picks
21st-century African-American people
20th-century African-American sportspeople